The early 1930s Renault commercial vehicles were a range of modular chassis produced by Renault, sold under various configurations, primarily trucks, buses and coaches. The range was the first from Renault to get diesel engines and it abandoned previous design styles from the company. The range was gradually replaced from 1935 onwards by the ACx and ADx light range, the ABx medium range and the ZP bus/coach.

History and overview

Beginnings of the early 1930s range
At the end of 1930, Renault ended production of its last "coalscuttle"-bonneted (with the radiator behind the engine) commercial vehicles, adopting more vertical grilles and, in some models, vertical slits on both sides of the engine compartment, as the radiator was moved ahead. At the same time, it was introducing its first diesel engines for road transport. These engines were a 7-litre inline-four and a 10.5-litre inline-six, both with direct injection. The inline-four was initially used on Renault's heavy trucks from 1930, and the inline-six was introduced in 1931. The engines had been extensively tested for two years and its development had as base Renault's experience on diesel marine engines, which allowed the company to create its own diesel engine technology instead of purchasing it to foreign manufacturers, as most of its French competitors did. The production of Renault's commercial range at the time was heavily modularised, with many standardised pieces, improving economies of scale, quality on mass production and also simplifying parts replacement.
 
The light and mid-range commercial vehicles for 1931 were largely made up from evolutions of existing models: the RY and KZ (both with payloads under 1 tonne), the OS (1.3-1.8 tonne payload), the PR (2 tonnes payload), the SX (2 tonnes payload), and the SZ (3 tonnes payload). The upper ranges had a mix of new and updated but old models, including the TL (4 tonnes payload), TR (5.5 tonnes payload), TS (7.5 tonnes payload), TI, and two tractor units (SY and TT).

Range expansion

For 1932, the lower range consisted on further upgraded vehicles, using inline-four (all except SX and SZ) and inline-six (SX and SZ) petrol engines. Most of the upper range used the already mentioned diesel engines and two petrol ones: a 6-litre inline-four and a 9.1-litre inline-six. The TI (5.5 tonnes payload) and the UD (7.5 tonnes payload) mounted the four engines, the TS (8 tonnes payload) only the inline-four ones, and the 6x2 VT (12 tonnes payload) only the inline-six. The range was completed by two tractor units: the TT (hauling capacity of up to 15 tonnes), using the four upper range engines; and the SY (hauling capacity of up to 6 tonnes), using the engine mounted on the SX-SZ.

About 1931–1932, Renault unveiled a new 3.8 inline-four diesel engine called the C-90, to be used in future vehicles. It also introduced short-lived 6×4 petrol-engined trucks with articulated suspension: the UC (7-tonne payload or tractor unit up to 15 tonnes) and the UR (4-tonne payload).

For the 1933 models, there were some changes compared to the ones for 1932: a new light vehicle called YP (0.75 tonnes payload), a new KZ chassis more focused on commercial use, the discontinuation of the TS. Renault also introduced vehicles with new diesel and petrol engines: the YF, replacing the SZ, and the YG tractor unit, replacing the SY. For 1934, Renault removed the SX, replacing it with the ZY (ZYAC, inline-four petrol, 2.5 tonnes payload) and started to phase out the PR, exchanging it for most uses with a new 2-tonne chassis, the ZJ, which was subject to less taxes and restrictions. A ZY version (ZYDC) received a new diesel engine, and both petrols and diesels for all the models were updated. The TI lost its inline-six petrol engine and the TT all its inline-four ones. A VT-based heavy truck, the ZF, was added to the lineup.

The French military commissioned various vehicles from Renault's commercial range, including the UD, the YF, the TI, and the PR.

End of the early 1930s range
By 1934, the French government established various restrictions on commercial vehicles. As a result of these, Renault began to introduce forward control designs, replacing the normal control (conventional cabin) it had been using in the early 1930s. At the 1934 Paris Salon, the company unveiled two forward control units for 1935: the ABF (5-tonne payload truck), the ZP (a coach), and announced a third, the ABG tractor unit (hauling capacity of up to 10 tonnes), which was unveiled at the Brussels Salon of that year.  The petrol-engined versions of the TT and the VT were removed from the lineup. For 1935 Renault also retired its last flathead petrol engines from the commercial range and gave minor updates to the diesel ones. Lastly, the company introduced a new YF-based coach, the ZI.

At the 1935 Paris Salon, Renault presented basically the same 1935 range for 1936. In practice, all the early 1930s commercial vehicles up to 3.5 tonnes payload were discontinued during the 1935–1936 period, its boxy styling replaced with the more curvy Renault ACx and ADx range. Most normal-control commercial vehicles over 3.5 tonnes payload were also discontinued, the exception being the UD, which subsisted on the lineup until 1937. A TI variant (the TI 4 AE) was produced for the military until 1938.

Technical details

1931 lineup
The Renault's commercial vehicle range for 1931 has gross combined weight ratings of up to 8.5 tonnes (for rigid trucks) and 16 tonnes (for tractor units with towed cargo). The bus/coach bodywork variants can carry between 10 (OS model) and up to 40 passengers (TI and TI  models).

1932 lineup
The Renault's commercial vehicle range for 1932 has about a dozen of different chassis configurations, with gross combined weight ratings of up to 14 tonnes (for rigid trucks) and 20 tonnes (for tractor units with towed cargo). The bus/coach bodywork variants can carry between 12 (OS model) and up to 45 passengers (TI model).

1933 lineup
The Renault's commercial vehicle range for 1933 has the same maximum gross combined weight ratings of the previous range. Some bus/coach variants got improvements on chassis and suspension.

1935 lineup
The Renault's commercial vehicle range for 1935 has about twenty three different chassis configurations, with a gross combined weight rating of up 20 tonnes. The bus/coach bodywork variants can carry between 14 (OS model) and up to 36 passengers (ZP model). Various models' chassis were modified to comply with the French law.

Notes

References

Renault vehicles